Anthony David Lees FRS (27 February 1917 – 3 October 1992) was a British entomologist

References

Fellows of the Royal Society
1917 births
1992 deaths